Peninsula Union School District is a public school district based in Humboldt County, California, United States.

References

External links
 

School districts in Humboldt County, California